The 1943 season was the Hawthorn Football Club's 19th season in the Victorian Football League and 42nd overall.

Fixture

Lightning Premiership

The lightning premiership was played between rounds 11 and 12.

Premiership Season

Ladder

References

Hawthorn Football Club seasons